Cosmopolitodus is an extinct genus of mackerel shark that lived between thirty to one million years ago during the late Oligocene to the Early Pleistocene epochs. Its type species is Cosmopolitodus hastalis, the broad-tooth mako (other common names include the extinct giant mako and broad-tooth white shark). In 2021, Isurus planus was reassigned to the genus, and thus became the second species C. planus. Its teeth can reach lengths up to 3.5 in (7.5 cm) and are found worldwide. It is believed to be an ancestor to the great white shark, an argument supported by the transitional species Carcharodon hubbelli, but as of 2021, no phylogenetic analyses have been done for proof.

Taxonomy

Etymology
Cosmopolitodus is derived from the Ancient Greek κοσμοπολίτης "kosmopolítēs" meaning "citizen of the world" and ὀδών "odṓn" meaning "tooth". The specific name hastalis may be derived from the Latin word hasta meaning "spear". The disputed species xiphodon is derived from the Ancient Greek ξίφος "xíphos" meaning "sword" and ὀδών "odṓn" meaning "tooth".

Taxonomic history

The taxonomy of C. hastalis, especially the status of its genus, has long been subject to debate. The initial binomial name was first given as Oxyrhina hastalis and Oxyrhina xiphodon for the narrow and broad-form variations respectively by Swiss naturalist Louis Agassiz in his 1843 paper Recherches sur les poissons fossiles, although some indications show that he had coined the taxon as early as 1838. Throughout the early and mid 20th century, different genera and species of other lamniformes would be clumped into the two taxa as the genus Oxyrhina began to be used as a wastebasket taxon. Sharks previously identified as variations of Oxyrhina hastalis or Oxyrhina xiphodon included two species of extinct ancestral makos, Isurus desori and Isurus retroflexus, the serrated mako (Carcharomodus escheri), and the false-toothed mako (Parotodus benedenii). Eventually, later studies would begin to show that much of the sharks within the genus and two species are distinct from each other, discarding the genus Oxyrhina altogether and creating another issue on what new taxa the sharks should be placed in. As of now, the genus is still uncertain and debated.

Shortly after the discarding of the genus Oxyrhina, a review by Holec et al. (1995) placed the species hastalis and xiphodon as a species of mako under the genus Isurus, citing the similarities between the teeth of the two and that of modern mako sharks. In 2001, a study by Ward & Bonavi (2001) considered Isurus hastalis and Isurus xiphodon as conspecific and declared the latter a nomen dubium. Although this conclusion is widely accepted, some scientists disagree, with a study by Whitenack and Gottfried (2010) demonstrating geometrically morphological differences between I. hastalis and I. xiphodon. The scientific name Isurus hastalis is considered as the "traditional view" in the debate regarding the shark's taxonomy.

Ward & Bonavi (2001) reexamined the teeth of I. hastalis and noted a strong morphological similarity between it and the extant great white shark. The study concluded that I. hastalis is a direct ancestor of the great white and is more related to it than other makos. They moved the species into the genus Cosmopolitodus, which was a move that was first proposed by Glikman (1964) but was long rejected beforehand. Later discoveries supports Ward & Bonavi's conclusion of its ancestry to the great white.  An analysis of a newly discovered Carcharodon hubbelli by Ehret et al. (2012) further cemented the theory of C. hastalis's ancestry to the great white, however, they also proposed that Cosmopolitodus should be moved to Carcharodon, remarking that the two genera were separated solely due to the lack of serrations in C. hastalis and the lack of lateral cusplets in C. carcharias and pointing out examples of Late Miocene C. hastalis teeth showing basal serrations. Cione et al. (2012) also noted a possibility of moving all species in the genus Cosmopolitodus into the genus Carcharodon to avoid a possible paraphyly that would occur if one of them, which was traditionally identified as C. xiphodon, is a putative sister species of C. carcharias. However, the study also noted that this would only be done if the putative sister species is conspecific with C. hastalis. The study concluded that there is indeed a putative sister species of C. carcharias distinct from C. hastalis and proposed the taxon Carcharodon plicatilis for it, resolving the paraphyly issue. 

However, Yun argued that the tooth fossil remains of Cosmopolitodus and the great white "have been documented from the same deposits, hence the former cannot be a chronospecific ancestor of the latter." He also criticized the fact that the "Cosmopolitodus morphotype has never been tested through phylogenetic analyses," and denoted that as of 2021, the argument that the Carcharodon lineage with narrow, serrated teeth evolved from Cosmopolitodus with broad, unserrated teeth is uncertain.

Evolution
C. hastalis is believed to be the ancestor of two lineages. The broad-form gave rise to the extant genus Carcharodon, while the narrow-form was the ancestor of two now-extinct sharks

Description
 

C. hastalis teeth can grow up to 3.5 inches in length, suggesting a very large shark. Its body was probably very similar to that of modern great whites. It is also believed to have a cosmopolitan distribution, with C. hastalis teeth being found worldwide. The species is divided into two forms based on tooth morphology, each with a unique evolutionary line.

Broad-form
The broad form is characterized by broad-shaped teeth often described as being identical to that of modern great whites besides the lack of serrations. Fossil evidence shows that the broad-form is the direct ancestor of the genus Carcharodon, and specimens from the Pisco Formation in Peru show an evolutionary mosaic between them.

This form is also commonly labeled by its species synonym xiphodon to reflect its difference from the narrow-form, although this is scientifically invalid.

Narrow-form
The narrow form has more slender teeth than its broad-form counterpart, which resemble broadened Isurus oxyrhinchus teeth. Unlike the broad-form, the narrow form is believed to be the ancestor of two extinct sharks, the hooked-tooth "mako" (Cosmopolitodus/Isurus planus), and the serrated "mako" (Carcharomodus escheri)

Paleobiology

Hunting behavior 
C. hastalis was a confirmed hunter of marine mammals. It most likely would have been one of the major predators in its ecosystem, preying upon small whales and other mammals. Trace fossils in the form of tooth marks on the bones of a Pliocene dolphin of the species Astadelphis gastaldii reveal that C. hastalis attacked its prey from below and behind, much like the modern great white shark does. The deepest bite marks on the dolphin's ribs indicate the shark aimed for the abdomen of its prey to inflict a fatal bite quickly and incapacitate its prey, and that when the dolphin was attacked a second time, it was bitten near the dorsal fin, suggesting that the dolphin rolled over while injured.

See also

 List of sharks
 List of prehistoric cartilaginous fish

References

Prehistoric fish of South America
Lamnidae
Prehistoric shark genera
Fossil taxa described in 1964
Miocene first appearances
Pliocene species extinctions
Miocene sharks
Pliocene sharks
Fossil taxa described in 1843
Taxa named by Louis Agassiz